MB, Mb or M. B. may refer to:

Businesses and organizations 
 Mälarhöjden/Bredäng Hockey, a Swedish ice hockey club
 Media Blasters, an American multimedia entertainment  distributor
 Mediobanca, and Italian company with Borsa Italiana stock symbol MB
 Mercedes-Benz, a German brand of automobiles, buses, coaches and trucks
 Milton Bradley Company, a board-game and sometime video-game publisher
 Muslim Brotherhood, a pan-Islamic movement

People
 Lee Myung-bak (born 1941), former president of South Korea
 Maurizio Bianchi or MB (born 1955), Italian composer of industrial music
 Mario Balotelli (born 1990), Italian footballer

Science and technology
 Megabyte (MB), a measure of information
 Megabit (Mb or Mbit), a measure of information
 MikroBitti (formerly MB), a Finnish computer magazine
 Mega base pairs, a unit of measurement in genetics
 Millibar, a unit of pressure
 Body wave magnitude (mb), a seismic scale
 Megabarn Mb and millibarn mb, units of cross-sectional area
 Millibel, a hundredth of a decibel (rarely used)
 Myoglobin, a compound in blood
 2-Methylbut-3-yn-2-ol, a reagent in organic synthesis
 Willys MB, the WWII-era Jeep

Other uses 
 mb (digraph), a combination of letters used in spelling
 Manitoba, Canada
 Medal of Bravery (Canada), a military decoration
 Bachelor of Medicine, an academic degree
 Province of Monza and Brianza, Italy
 MusicBrainz, an online open data music database